The 2017–18 Egyptian Second Division was the 38th edition of the Egyptian Second Division, the top Egyptian semi-professional level for football clubs, since its establishment in 1977. The season began on 14 September 2017 and concluded on 19 April 2018. Fixtures for the 2017–18 season were announced on 30 August 2017.

El Gouna, Nogoom El Mostakbal and Haras El Hodoud won Group A, Group B and Group C respectively and secured the promotion to the 2018–19 Egyptian Premier League.

Team changes
The following teams have changed division since the 2016–17 season.

To Second Division
Promoted from Third Division

 Al Salam
 Al Walideya
 Beni Mazar
 El Shams
 Al Fanar
 Abou Sakal
 Beni Ebeid
 MS Minyat Samanoud
 Abou Qir Fertilizers

Relegated from Premier League

 Aswan
 Al Nasr Lel Taa'den
 El Sharkia

From Second Division
Relegated to Third Division

 Naser El Fekreia
 Tahta
 Al Badari
 Al Wasta
 MS Tamya
 El Sekka El Hadid
 Damietta
 Eastern Company
 Telecom Egypt
 Manshiyat El Shohada
 El Horreya
 BWADC
 Badr
 Dikernis
 Said El Mahalla

Promoted to Premier League

 Al Assiouty Sport
 Al Nasr
 El Raja

Teams
A total of forty-eight teams competed in the league, including thirty-six sides from the 2016–17 season, three relegated from the 2016–17 Egyptian Premier League and nine promoted from the 2016–17 Egyptian Third Division.

Note: Table lists in alphabetical order.

Group A

Group B

Group C

Results

League tables

Group A

Group B

Group C

Results tables

Group A

Group B

Group C

References

Egyptian Second Division seasons
Egy
Egy
Second Division